Kimberley Jane Scott (née Walsh; born 20 November 1981) is an English singer, fashion designer, model, variety performer, television presenter, actress and dancer. She rose to fame in late 2002 when she auditioned for the reality series Popstars: The Rivals on ITV. The series announced that Walsh had won a place as a member of the girl group Girls Aloud. The group achieved large success, having twenty consecutive top ten singles (including four number ones) in the UK, six studio albums have all been certified platinum by the British Phonographic Industry (BPI), two of which went to number one in the UK, and accumulating a total of five BRIT Award nominations. In 2009, Girls Aloud won "Best Single" with their song "The Promise".

During the group's hiatus, Walsh embarked on acting and presenting. In July 2010, she became a presenter on the music talkshow, Suck My Pop and presented coverage for the BAFTA Awards. In 2011, she appeared in Horrid Henry: The Movie as Prissy Polly. Musically, Walsh has featured on Aggro Santos's "Like U Like". In 2012, Walsh made her West End theatre debut, playing Princess Fiona in the London production of Shrek the Musical. She also fronted the 2009 Autumn/Winter collection for the fashion chain New Look and, in January 2011, she was revealed as the new face of Puma AG. In 2012, Walsh took part in Strictly Come Dancing, where she finished as one of the runners-up.

Since 2011, after making her West End debut in Shrek, Walsh has returned to perform in stage versions of popular films such as Elf in 2015, before Big and Sleepless in Seattle both in 2019.

Early life 
Walsh was born on 20 November 1981 in Bradford, West Yorkshire, the daughter of John and Diane Walsh. She grew up with three siblings, Sally Walsh, Amy Walsh and Adam Walsh in Allerton, West Yorkshire. Sally played the character of Lyn Hutchinson on the soap opera Emmerdale between 1997 and 2000, and Amy joined the show's cast in 2014 as Tracy Shankley.

Walsh attended Sandy Lane Primary School, Stoney Lee Middle School, and Beckfoot Grammar School, and had her first taste of fame appearing in an advert as a child along with sister Sally in an Asda advert. She starred as Young Cosette in a regional production of Les Misérables and starred in ITV's The Book Tower in 1986. Walsh attended the Bradford theatre school, Stage 84, and briefly taught there.

Music career

Girls Aloud 

Walsh auditioned for the reality television show Popstars: The Rivals in 2002 with the song "Where Do Broken Hearts Go". Several thousand applicants attended auditions across the UK in hope of being selected. Ten girls and ten boys were chosen as finalists by judges Pete Waterman, Louis Walsh and Geri Halliwell. Walsh did not initially make it into the group of ten female contestants who were to appear on the show. However, when another contestant was disqualified on a technicality, she found herself on the show. These finalists then took to the stage participating in weekly Saturday night live performances which alternated weekly between the girls and boys. Each week, the contestant polling the fewest phone votes was eliminated, until the final line-ups of the groups emerged. Walsh joined Nadine Coyle, Sarah Harding, Nicola Roberts, and Cheryl Tweedy to comprise the new girl group Girls Aloud, formed through the show by a public vote on 30 November 2002.

 The group's debut single "Sound of the Underground" peaked at number one on the UK Singles Chart, becoming the 2002 Christmas number one. Girls Aloud hold the record for the shortest time between formation and reaching number one. The group released their debut album Sound of the Underground in May 2003, which entered the charts at number two and was certified platinum by the British Phonographic Industry (BPI) later the same year. Their singles "I'll Stand by You", "Walk This Way", and "The Promise" have charted at number one. Two of their albums have reached the top of the UK Albums Chart: their greatest hits album The Sound of Girls Aloud and 2008's Out of Control, both of which entered the chart at number one, with over one million copies of the former being sold.
They also achieved seven certified albums and have been nominated for five Brit Awards, winning the 2009 Best Single for "The Promise".

The group's musical style is pop, but throughout their career they had experimented with electropop and dance-pop. Girls Aloud's collaborations with Brian Higgins and his songwriting and production team Xenomania earned the group critical acclaim, due to an innovative approach to mainstream pop music. The group became one of the few UK reality television acts to achieve continued success, amassing a fortune of £30 million by May 2010. Guinness World Records lists them as "Most Successful Reality TV Group" in the 2007 edition. They also hold the record for "Most Consecutive Top Ten Entries in the UK by a Female Group" in the 2008 edition, and are credited again for "Most Successful Reality TV Group" in the 2011 edition. The group was also named the United Kingdom's biggest selling girl group of the 21st century, with over 4.3 million singles sales and 4 million albums sold in the UK alone.

In July 2009, Girls Aloud announced they would take a year-long hiatus to pursue solo projects. Walsh revealed that she does not think it is possible Girls Aloud will ever "officially break up". She explained that they are planning to tour again and will probably take breaks from time to time, doing solo projects but they will never permanently go their separate ways.

After Girls Aloud's three years of hiatus, the group reunited for their 10th anniversary. The group released their new single, "Something New" on 18 November 2012. The music video for the song was filmed in October 2012, and premiered on YouTube on 19 October 2012. The song was also the official charity single for Children in Need in 2012. The group released their second greatest hits compilation, Ten on 26 November 2012. In 2013, the group embarked on Ten - The Hits Tour 2013. They announced their split soon after the tour ended.

Solo work 

It was first rumoured that Walsh was about to make a record deal with her band's record label, Fascination Records, although nothing has been confirmed. Soon after the rumour, Walsh confirmed on Suck My Pop, a programme that she co-hosts on the television channel Viva in the United Kingdom, that she will feature on English rapper Aggro Santos' upcoming single, "Like U Like". The track will be her first step away from Girls Aloud as a singer. Walsh was asked for OK! Magazine: "Kimberley, there are rumours, that you will be releasing a solo album..." and Walsh said: "Gosh! I haven't got any plan to do that. Gary Barlow signed Aggro Santos and he asked me to sing Like U Like, and I've done a song for the Horrid Henry film that I'm in titled "Everybody Dance". I'm not sure about doing anything big on my own just yet." In 2012 she made her West End theatre debut, playing Princess Fiona in the London production of Shrek the Musical. The announcement came after Amanda Holden announced her pregnancy in August 2011. Walsh teamed up with Alfie Boe to record a version of Queen's "One Vision"  as the Official Olympic Team Great Britain Single. Walsh has also performed with several artists including Neyo with "Hate That I Love You", Ronan Keating's "No Matter What" and James Cullum with "Rainy Days and Mondays". In August 2012 it was announced that Walsh is in discussions with Gary Barlow to release a solo album for a 2013 release.

On 7 September 2012, Walsh was announced as one of the 14 celebrities, competing in tenth series of Strictly Come Dancing. Her professional partner is last year's runner-up Pasha Kovalev. She received 3 perfect 40s during the series, and she finished as one of the runners-up alongside presenter Denise Van Outen, behind the winner Olympian Louis Smith.

On 4 February 2013 Walsh released, through Decca Records, her debut album Centre Stage which features a series of popular musical tunes as well as two brand new tracks.

Walsh has written her own autobiography, called A Whole Lot of History. The book was released on 26 September 2013.

In March 2014, Walsh took part in recording England's 2014 World Cup song. She collaborated with the likes of fellow pop stars Melanie C, Eliza Doolittle, Emma Bunton, Conor Maynard, Katy B and Pixie Lott, on "Greatest Day", a track originally performed by British band, Take That. The track was produced by Gary Barlow and recorded at Sarm Studios in London. The track also featured past footballers such as Gary Lineker, Michael Owen, Geoff Hurst, David Seaman, Peter Shilton, Glenn Hoddle and Dion Dublin on backing vocals.

Acting 
Before Walsh became a member of Girls Aloud, she had worked in theatre and acting. In 2000 Walsh appeared in the television series This Is Personal: The Hunt for the Yorkshire Ripper as Gillian Oldfield, and
starred in a BBC Educational Schools programme called Focus. In the same year, Walsh applied for the role of Maria Sutherland in Coronation Street. However, she lost out to Samia Ghadie. In 2001, Walsh played Tracy in Dream Back.  In 2007, alongside her bandmates she appeared in St. Trinian's playing a school band member. In 2008 she and bandmate Nicola Roberts had small parts in Britannia High, in which they played themselves.

Walsh stated that she would like to star in a musical in the future, playing a stage role. In March 2008 she appeared in reality TV series The Passions of Girls Aloud where she successfully auditioned for the role of a cast member of Les Misérables, and was also allowed to sing an encore of "On My Own" in character.

In late 2010, Walsh landed a role in the live-action 3D family comedy film Horrid Henry: The Movie as the titular character's overactive cousin Prissy Polly, with the film being released on 29 July 2011. Walsh also appeared in the 2013 movie All Stars, alongside Theo Stevenson once again, who she appeared with first in Horrid Henry: The Movie. She plays the minor role of his character's mother.

On 5 October 2011 through 21 May 2012 she made her West End theatre debut, playing Princess Fiona in the London production of Shrek the Musical. The announcement came after Amanda Holden announced her pregnancy in August 2011. Originally signed on until 27 February 2012, she extended her run to 21 May 2012. She subsequently returned to the West End stage in October 2015, playing the role of Jovie in Elf: The Musical.

In 2018, she appeared in the second series of the Channel 4 school drama Ackley Bridge as Claire Butterworth. On her casting, she commented: "It was nice to hear the northern accent everywhere you turn. A lot of the kids were really excited that I was there because I was from Bradford. It's a very small town and a lot of the kids came from there that were in the show."

In 2019, she returned to theatre where she played Susan in the Original London Cast of Big (musical) alongside Jay McGuiness as Tom Hank's character of Josh. In 2020; Walsh reunited with McGuiness to originate the role of Annie in Sleepless: The Musical, based on Sleepless in Seattle which, due to Covid restrictions, only ran for a limited season.

Presenting 
Walsh appeared in Let's Dance for Sport Relief as a panellist and also fronted coverage of the BAFTA Awards for MTV on her own programme Kimberley Walsh at the BAFTAS in 2010 and in the summer of 2010 hosted sky 1 documentary "Girl in the Blue Jeans". She also presented coverage for The X Factor live from South Shields on the day of the final in 2009 for Joe McElderry. On 17 – 18 June 2010, Walsh hosted Channel 4's The 5 O'Clock Show with Stephen Mulhern. Walsh appeared in her own documentary for Sky 1 named Kimberley Walsh: Blue Jean Girl which aired on Wednesday, 17 June 2010. On the same day, Walsh appeared on This Morning to promote the show. Walsh later became a presenter of new music talk-show, titled Suck My Pop, on Viva. Walsh also starred as a judge for ITV's entertainment show Born To Shine.

On 9 April 2016, Walsh co-presented Weekend Brunch the Grand National Day special with Tim Lovejoy.

Other ventures 
Walsh climbed Mount Kilimanjaro in aid of Comic Relief in March 2009. The climb, organised by Gary Barlow, was also undertaken by fellow Girls Aloud member Cheryl, Alesha Dixon, Fearne Cotton, Denise Van Outen, Chris Moyles, Ben Shephard, Ronan Keating and Barlow himself. Between 3 February and 23 March 2009, Walsh, Cole, Barlow, Moyles and Cotton also raised money for Comic Relief by providing the voice for the BT Speaking Clock.

As of 26 August 2009, Walsh was modelling for the clothing line New Look following in the footsteps of Lily Allen and Alexa Chung. Walsh became OK! magazine's new weekly columnist in August 2010. The column is called "Kimberley Calls The Shots".

She was also named as the new face and hair of Schwarzkopf for a reported 6 figure deal. In March 2011, Walsh teamed up with Tess Daly and Joanna Page to work with Maltesers to promote Red Nose Day 2011. In January 2011, Walsh was revealed as the new face of Puma AG BodyTrain fitness toner wear. In May 2011, Walsh was named as the face of Right Guards Xtreme Dry Range.

In 2017, Walsh launched a children's clothing line called "Kimba's Kids" which she runs with her brother. In September 2019, she signed with outdoor clothing company Regatta.

In 2022, Walsh appeared ln S.11 Ep.20 of Celebrity Antiques Road Trip,  broadcast on BBC Two, competing against actor Ryan Thomas who won the challenge.

Strictly Come Dancing 
In September 2012, Walsh was revealed as one of the fourteen celebrities, competing in the tenth series of the BBC reality dancing competition, Strictly Come Dancing. Her professional partner was Pasha Kovalev. On 22 December 2012, Walsh and Kovalev became the joint runners-up in the final, along with Denise van Outen and losing to Louis Smith.

Strictly Come Dancing performances

Personal life 

Walsh married long-term partner Justin Scott, a former member of the British boy band Triple 8, on 30 January 2016. Together, the couple has three sons.

Discography

Studio albums

Singles

As lead artist

As featured artist

Filmography

Awards 
She placed number 37 in FHM's annual list of "100 Sexiest Woman in the World" in 2009 ahead of bandmates Nadine Coyle, Nicola Roberts and Sarah Harding who were placed at 57, 58 and 87 respectively. Walsh also won the Yorkshire Woman of the Year award 2009 in recognition not only of her professional success but also for her role as celebrity ambassador for the Breast Cancer Haven charity, which has a branch in Leeds. She was too, awarded the Cosmopolitan Ultimate Woman's award in 2009.

See also
 List of Strictly Come Dancing contestants

References

External links 
 
 
 Morning Live (BBC One)

1981 births
Actresses from Bradford
English musical theatre actresses
Girls Aloud members
Living people
Musicians from Bradford
Popstars winners
English people of Irish descent
Alumni of Leeds Trinity University